Nicholas Matthew Schneidau Kirkwood (born July 1980) is a British footwear designer. He lives in Bethnal Green, London.

Early life
Nicholas Matthew Schneidau Kirkwood was born in July 1980. He learned the craft of shoemaking at London-based Cordwainers College.

Career
Kirkwood formed his eponymous British brand in 2004, together with his business partner Christopher Suarez. In 2013, LVMH acquired a majority stake in his company for an undisclosed sum. Kirkwood’s collections are distributed in 150 leading department and specialty stores around the world as well as three flagship stores in London, New York and Las Vegas.

In 2010, Kirkwood succeeded Jonathan Saunders as creative director of Milan-based fashion house Pollini. He left the company in 2014.

Recognition
Kirkwood has twice been named Accessories Designer of the Year at the British Fashion Awards, and in 2013 became the first Accessories Designer to be awarded the British Fashion Council/Vogue Designer Fashion Fund.

Awards 
 2005: Conde Nast / Footwear News - Vivian Infantino Award for Emerging Talent
2007: Vogue Italia / Alta Roma - Who’s on Next Award for Accessory Designer
2008: Conde Nast / Footwear News - Designer of the Year
2008: British Fashion Awards - Swarovski Award for Emerging Talent - Accessories
2008: British Fashion Council - S/S 2009 - New Gen
2008: British Fashion Council - A/W 2008 - New Gen
2009: British Fashion Council - A/W 2009 - New Gen
2010: British Fashion Award - Accessory Designer of the Year Award
2010: DWGSN Global Fashion Awards - Most Influential Designer - Accessories
 2011: Conde Nast / Footwear News - Designer of the Year
 2012: British Fashion Award - Accessories Designer of the Year Award
 2012: Elle UK Style Awards - Accessories Designer of the Year
2013: BFC and Vogue Designer Fashion Fund - Prize winner
2013: Elle Style Awards - Accessories Designer of the Year

References

External links
 Official website

1980 births
British fashion designers
Living people